Greatest Hits Live is a live album released by the American rock band Journey in 1998, recorded in 1981 and 1983. It contains songs from the studio albums Infinity (1978) through Frontiers (1983). The album peaked at No. 79 on the US Billboard 200 chart.

Track listing

Personnel
Band members
Steve Perry – lead vocals, keyboards, piano
Neal Schon – lead guitar, vocals
Jonathan Cain – keyboards, piano, rhythm guitar, vocals
Ross Valory – bass, vocals
Steve Smith – drums, percussion

Production
Kevin Shirley – producer, mixing
Guy Charbonneau, Biff Dawes, Kevin Elson – engineers
Greg Gasperino – mixing assistant
George Marino – mastering
John Kalodner – A&R executive

References

Albums produced by Kevin Shirley
Journey (band) live albums
1998 live albums
Columbia Records live albums